The 1966 California Golden Bears football team was an American football team that represented the University of California, Berkeley in the Athletic Association of Western Universities (AAWU) during the 1966 NCAA University Division football season. In their third year under head coach Ray Willsey, the Golden Bears compiled a 3–7 record (2–3 in AAWU, fifth), and were outscored 197 to 131.

The team's statistical leaders included Barry Bronk with 965 passing yards, Rick Bennett with 319 rushing yards, and Jerry Bradley with 473 receiving yards.

Schedule

References

External links
Game program: California vs. Washington State at Spokane – September 17, 1966

California
California Golden Bears football seasons
California Golden Bears football